The 2007 FIA GT Nogaro 2 Hours was the ninth round of the 2007 FIA GT Championship season.  It took place at Circuit Paul Armagnac, France, on September 30, 2007.

Official results
Class winners in bold.  Cars failing to complete 75% of winner's distance marked as Not Classified (NC).  Cars with a C under their class are running in the Citation Cup, with the winner marked in bold italics.

Statistics
 Pole Position - #1 Vitaphone Racing Team - 1:23.763
 Average Speed - 146.21 km/h

References

N
FIA GT Nogaro
FIA GT Nogaro